Robin Duvillard (born 22 December 1983) is a French former cross-country skier and non-commissioned officer who began competeting in 2002.

Career
At the 2010 Winter Olympics in Vancouver, he finished 50th in the 30 km mixed pursuit event. At the 2014 Winter Olympics in Sochi, he finished sixth in the 50 km freestyle mass start.

Duvillard's best World Cup finish is second in the 9 km freestyle pursuit climb in Val Di Fiemme that concluded the 2016 Tour de Ski.

Cross-country skiing results
All results are sourced from the International Ski Federation (FIS).

Olympic Games
 1 medal – (1 bronze)

World Championships
 1 medal – (1 bronze)

World Cup

Season standings

Individual podiums

1 podium – (1 )

References

External links
 
 Official homepage

1983 births
Cross-country skiers at the 2010 Winter Olympics
Cross-country skiers at the 2014 Winter Olympics
French male cross-country skiers
Living people
Olympic cross-country skiers of France
People from Saint-Martin-d'Hères
Medalists at the 2014 Winter Olympics
Olympic bronze medalists for France
Olympic medalists in cross-country skiing
FIS Nordic World Ski Championships medalists in cross-country skiing
Tour de Ski skiers
Sportspeople from Isère
21st-century French people